Vessel, also known as Sebastian Gainsborough is a music producer and composer from Bristol, England.

Musical career 
Electronic producer and composer Seb Gainsborough (Vessel) began his career as a producer of bass driven, experimental electronica both as a solo artist as well as under numerous guises alongside and as part of Bristol's 'Young Echo' Collective, most notably as a member of Killing Sound.

Following a number of limited 12" EP releases with London label Left Blank and an EP on Mute Records subsidiary, Liberation Technologies, Gainsborough's 'Vessel' solo output has been released by Tri Angle Records.

His trio of albums on Tri Angle, Order of Noise, Punish, Honey and Queen of Golden Dogs have been widely acclaimed, averaging 78/100 on review aggregator Metacritic.

Alongside his studio album releases, Gainsborough has over recent years become increasingly known for his collaborative practice, especially concerning his collaboration with both classical instrumentalists and AV artists. Notably, he has collaborated extensively with visual artist Pedro Maia, contemporary classical collectives Immix Ensemble and Manchester Collective, acclaimed violinist Rakhi Singh and renowned visual artist Anouk de Clerq.

In July 2020 Gainsborough announced the launch of a new music imprint 'Paplu' in partnership with long-time collaborator, violinist Rakhi Singh. To mark this, a new edit of 2014's Red Sex was released featuring Singh on viola and violin. This was followed up by Passion in November 2020, a long form work for strings, electronics and voice, launching with a video by Pedro Maia.

On April 12, 2022, he announced on his social media feed that he had co-composed the score for Robert Eggers Viking epic, The Northman with Robin Carolan, which released the following week in the UK, with its US cinematic release the following week.

The soundtrack was highly praised in reviews, LA Weekly writing that "Every frame of Jarin Blaschke’s cinematography is a carefully rendered baroque painting, while the score by Robin Carolan and Sebastian Gainsborough pushes us deeper into the ether with transcendent rhythms and primordial drums".

Empire (magazine), in their five star review said of the score, "Long takes like these, accompanied by composers Robin Carolan and Sebastian Gainsborough’s pulsating score, throbbing with drumbeats and low notes, emphasise the savage spectacle and unforgiving harshness of these times, but also the powerful physicality of Skarsgård" and IGN "The music, by Robin Carolan and Sebastian Gainsborough, is absolutely key, veering between folk-like strings that evoke King Aurvandill’s regality as he returns from war, and percussions so heavy — during murkier and more spiritual segments — that with the right theatrical sound system, the bass is sure to rattle your ribcage."

The soundtrack was released digitally by Backlot Music coinciding with the cinematic release on April 22, and on tape, CD and various vinyl editions by Sacred Bones Records on July 22.

In November 2022, Fever Ray announced their new single, 'Carbon Dioxide', a co-composition between Karin Dreijer (Fever Ray) and Vessel. The single lands ahead of Fever Ray's upcoming 2023 album 'Radical Romantics', which is also set to feature the likes of Olof Dreijer, Nídia, Peder Mannerfelt, Trent Reznor and Atticus Ross.

Discography

Albums

EPs

Singles

Remixes

Production

Soundtracks

Composition for Live Performance

References

External links 
 Official Website
 Bandcamp.com
 Spotify.com

Living people
Year of birth missing (living people)
English composers
English electronic musicians
English male composers
Musicians from Bristol